Dirck Bleker (1621 in Haarlem – 1702 in Haarlem), was a Dutch Golden Age painter.

Biography 
According to Houbraken he painted a Danae for the Lord of Halsteren, Baljuw of Kennemerland, that was made famous by a poem by Joost van den Vondel.

According to the RKD he was the son of the painter Gerrit Claesz Bleker and was a member of the Haarlem Guild of St. Luke. His name, marked with a 'd', which meant 'dead before Vincent van der Vinne', was in the list of guild painters kept by Laurens van der Vinne after his father's death in 1702.

References

External links 

 Dirck Bleker on Artnet

1621 births
1702 deaths
Dutch Golden Age painters
Dutch male painters
Artists from Haarlem
Painters from Haarlem